Mount Hum is a mountain located on the island of Vis, Croatia. It is the highest elevation point of Vis with its . A military radar station is located on the top and the peak is not accessible to civilians.

References

Mountains of Croatia
Vis (island)
Landforms of Split-Dalmatia County